Jack Edward Alderman (May 29, 1951 – September 16, 2008) was, at the time of his execution, the longest-serving death row prisoner in the United States who has been executed. He had remained on death row for over 33 years.

History 
Jack Alderman was born on May 29, 1951 in Garden City, Georgia.

On June 14, 1975, he was convicted for his part in the killing of his wife, Barbara Jean Alderman, and was subsequently sentenced to death by the Superior Court of Chatham County, Georgia. His wife was beaten to death with a crescent wrench and choked before being dumped into a creek in Rincon, near Barbara's mother's home.

On April 1, 1985, at a new sentencing trial, he was again sentenced to die.

A Timesonline article states: "Alderman's co-defendant, John Brown, a drug addict and alcoholic, confessed to the murder, but then changed his story to implicate Alderman. Brown claimed that he and Alderman killed Mrs Alderman together, and that Alderman promised to pay him for his role in the killing. There was no forensic evidence and Alderman was convicted only as a result of statements provided by Brown."

The prosecutors, however, maintained that Jack Alderman attempted to defraud $20,000 from his wife's life insurance, which was provided for by Barbara's employer, the City of Savannah.

Marcel Berlins of The Guardian wrote: "Alderman had claimed from the start he was innocent, even refusing to enter into plea bargains that would have spared his life, because that would have meant admitting his culpability".

Alderman was held at the Georgia Diagnostic and Classification Prison in Jackson, Georgia.

Constitutionality of lethal injection
On September 19, 2007, an execution date for Jack Alderman, there was a temporary stay while the Supreme Court decided on the constitutionality of lethal injection.

Legal action and campaigning 
The Law Society, the Bar Council and the charity Reprieve, all organizations in Europe, called on the United Kingdom's then Foreign Secretary to use diplomatic channels to stay the execution of American convict Alderman and end what they called the "gross injustice of 34 years". They also sent letters to the Governor and Attorney-General of Georgia and its Board of Pardons and Paroles. Alderman was represented free-of-charge by the London law firm Clifford Chance.

Execution 
He was executed by lethal injection by the US State of Georgia on September 16, 2008.

Jack Alderman was pronounced dead at 7:25 p.m. EDT at the Georgia Diagnostic and Classification State Prison.

See also 
 Capital punishment in Georgia (U.S. state)
 Capital punishment in the United States
 List of people executed in Georgia (U.S. state)
 List of people executed in the United States in 2008

References

External links
 Comments by Anita Roddick.
 Campaign site: Exonerate Jack.
 Letter from Jack Alderman to his lawyer about his life on death row. (Dead link)

1951 births
2008 deaths
1975 murders in the United States
People executed by Georgia (U.S. state) by lethal injection
21st-century executions by Georgia (U.S. state)
21st-century executions of American people
American people executed for murder
American people convicted of murder
People convicted of murder by Georgia (U.S. state)